Kaleka Mutoke (born 7 July 1966) is a Congolese long-distance runner. He competed in the marathon at the 1988 Summer Olympics and the 1996 Summer Olympics.

References

External links
 

1966 births
Living people
Athletes (track and field) at the 1988 Summer Olympics
Athletes (track and field) at the 1992 Summer Olympics
Athletes (track and field) at the 1996 Summer Olympics
Democratic Republic of the Congo male long-distance runners
Democratic Republic of the Congo male marathon runners
Olympic athletes of the Democratic Republic of the Congo
Place of birth missing (living people)
Olympic male marathon runners
21st-century Democratic Republic of the Congo people